Guillermo Martínez (born 18 January 1969) is an Argentine volleyball player. He competed in the men's tournament at the 1996 Summer Olympics.

References

1969 births
Living people
Argentine men's volleyball players
Olympic volleyball players of Argentina
Volleyball players at the 1996 Summer Olympics
Place of birth missing (living people)